The following outline is provided as an overview of and topical guide to artificial intelligence:

Artificial intelligence (AI) – intelligence exhibited by machines or software. It is also the name of the scientific field which studies how to create computers and computer software that are capable of intelligent behaviour.

AI algorithms and techniques

Search 
 Discrete search algorithms 
 Uninformed search 
 Brute force search
 Search tree
 Breadth first search
 Depth-first search 
 State space search
 Informed search
 Best-first search 
 A* search algorithm
 Heuristics
 Pruning (algorithm)
 Adversarial search
 Minmax algorithm
 Logic as search 
 Production system (computer science), Rule based system
 Production rule, Inference rule, Horn clause
 Forward chaining
 Backward chaining
 Planning as search
 State space search
 Means-ends analysis

Optimization search 
 Optimization (mathematics) algorithms
 Hill climbing
 Simulated annealing
 Beam search 
 Random optimization
 Evolutionary computation
 Genetic algorithms
 Gene expression programming
 Genetic programming
 Differential evolution
 Society based learning algorithms.
 Swarm intelligence 
 Particle swarm optimization
 Ant colony optimization
 Metaheuristic

Logic
 Logic and automated reasoning
 Programming using logic
 Logic programming
 See "Logic as search" above.
 Forms of Logic
 Propositional logic
 First-order logic
 First-order logic with equality
 Constraint satisfaction
 Fuzzy logic
 Fuzzy set theory
 Fuzzy systems
 Combs method
 Ordered weighted averaging aggregation operator 
 Perceptual Computing –
 Default reasoning and other solutions to the frame problem and qualification problem 
 Non-monotonic logic
 Abductive reasoning
 Default logic
 Circumscription (logic)
 Closed world assumption
 Domain specific logics
 Representing categories and relations 
 Description logics
 Semantic networks
 Inheritance (computer science) 
 Frame (artificial intelligence) 
 Scripts (artificial intelligence)
 Representing events and time
 Situation calculus
 Event calculus 
 Fluent calculus 
 Causes and effects
 causal calculus
 Knowledge about knowledge
 Belief revision
 Modal logics
 paraconsistent logics 
 Planning using logic
Satplan
 Learning using logic
 Inductive logic programming
 Explanation based learning
 Relevance based learning
 Case based reasoning
 General logic algorithms
 Automated theorem proving

Other symbolic knowledge and reasoning tools
Symbolic representations of knowledge
 Ontology (information science)
 Upper ontology
 Domain ontology
 Frame (artificial intelligence)
 Semantic net
 Conceptual Dependency Theory
Unsolved problems in knowledge representation
 Default reasoning
 Frame problem
 Qualification problem
 Commonsense knowledge

Probabilistic methods for uncertain reasoning
 Stochastic methods for uncertain reasoning:
 Bayesian networks
 Bayesian inference algorithm 
 Bayesian learning and the expectation-maximization algorithm
 Bayesian decision theory and Bayesian decision networks
 Probabilistic perception and control:
 Dynamic Bayesian networks
 Hidden Markov model
 Kalman filters
 Fuzzy Logic
 Decision tools from economics:
 Decision theory
 Decision analysis
 Information value theory
 Markov decision processes 
 Dynamic decision networks
 Game theory
 Mechanism design
 Algorithmic information theory
 Algorithmic probability

Classifiers and statistical learning methods
 Classifier (mathematics) and Statistical classification
 Alternating decision tree
 Artificial neural network (see below) 
 K-nearest neighbor algorithm
 Kernel methods
 Support vector machine
 Naive Bayes classifier

Artificial neural networks
 Artificial neural networks 
 Network topology
 feedforward neural networks 
 Perceptrons
 Multi-layer perceptrons 
 Radial basis networks
 Convolutional neural network
 Long short-term memory 
 Recurrent neural networks
 Hopfield networks 
 Attractor networks
 Deep learning
 Hybrid neural network
 Learning algorithms for neural networks
 Hebbian learning
 Backpropagation
 GMDH
 Competitive learning
 Supervised backpropagation
 Neuroevolution
 Restricted Boltzmann machine

Biologically based or embodied 
 Behavior based AI 
 Subsumption architecture
 Nouvelle AI
 Developmental robotics
 Situated AI
 Bio-inspired computing 
 Artificial immune systems
 Embodied cognitive science
 Embodied cognition

Cognitive architecture and multi-agent systems 
 Artificial intelligence systems integration
 Cognitive architecture
 LIDA (cognitive architecture)
 Agent architecture 
 Control system
 Hierarchical control system
 Networked control system
 Distributed artificial intelligence –
 Multi-agent system –
 Hybrid intelligent system
 Monitoring and Surveillance Agents
 Blackboard system

Philosophy

Definition of AI 
 Dartmouth proposal ("Every aspect of learning or any other feature of intelligence can in principle be so precisely described that a machine can be made to simulate it")
 Turing test
 Computing Machinery and Intelligence
 Intelligent agent and rational agent 
 Action selection
 AI effect
 Synthetic intelligence

Classifying AI
 Symbolic vs sub-symbolic AI
 Symbolic AI
 Physical symbol system
 Dreyfus' critique of AI
 Moravec's paradox
 Elegant and simple vs. ad-hoc and complex
 Neat vs. Scruffy
 Society of Mind (scruffy approach)
 The Master Algorithm (neat approach)
 Level of generality and flexibility
 Artificial general intelligence
 Narrow AI
 Level of precision and correctness
 Soft computing 
 "Hard" computing
 Level of intelligence 
 Progress in artificial intelligence
 Superintelligence
 Level of consciousness, mind and understanding
 Chinese room
 Hard problem of consciousness
 Computationalism
 Functionalism (philosophy of mind)
 Robot rights
 User illusion 
 Artificial consciousness

Goals and applications

General intelligence 
 Artificial general intelligence 
 AI-complete

Reasoning and Problem Solving 
 Automated reasoning
 Mathematics
 Automated theorem prover
 Computer-assisted proof –
 Computer algebra
 General Problem Solver
 Expert system –  
 Decision support system –  
 Clinical decision support system –

Knowledge Representation 
 Knowledge representation
 Knowledge management 
 Cyc

Planning 
 Automated planning and scheduling
 Strategic planning
 Sussman anomaly –

Learning 
 Machine learning – 
 Constrained Conditional Models –  
 Deep learning –  
 Neural modeling fields –

Natural language processing 
 Natural language processing (outline) – 
 Chatterbots – 
 Language identification – 
 Natural language user interface – 
 Natural language understanding –  
 Machine translation – 
 Statistical semantics – 
 Question answering – 
 Semantic translation – 
 Concept mining – 
 Data mining – 
 Text mining – 
 Process mining – 
 E-mail spam filtering – 
 Information extraction – 
 Named-entity extraction – 
 Coreference resolution – 
 Named-entity recognition – 
 Relationship extraction – 
 Terminology extraction –

Perception 
 Machine perception
 Pattern recognition – 
 Computer Audition –  
 Speech recognition – 
 Speaker recognition – 
 Computer vision (outline) – 
 Image processing
 Intelligent word recognition –  
 Object recognition – 
 Optical mark recognition – 
 Handwriting recognition – 
 Optical character recognition – 
 Automatic number plate recognition – 
 Information extraction – 
 Image retrieval – 
 Automatic image annotation – 
 Facial recognition systems – 
 Silent speech interface – 
 Activity recognition –
 Percept (artificial intelligence)

Robotics 
 Robotics – 
 Behavior-based robotics – 
 Cognitive – 
 Cybernetics – 
 Developmental robotics – 
 Epigenetic robotics – 
 Evolutionary robotics –

Control 

 Intelligent control
 Self-management (computer science) –
 Autonomic Computing –
 Autonomic Networking –

Social intelligence 
 Affective computing
 Kismet

Game playing 
 Game artificial intelligence – 
 Computer game bot – computer replacement for human players.
 Video game AI – 
 Computer chess – 
 Computer Go – 
 General game playing – 
 General video game playing –

Creativity, art and entertainment 
 Artificial creativity
 Creative computing
 Artificial intelligence art
 Uncanny valley
 Music and artificial intelligence
 Computational humor
 Chatterbot

Integrated AI systems 
 AIBO – Sony's robot dog. It integrates vision, hearing and motorskills.
 Asimo (2000 to present) – humanoid robot developed by Honda, capable of walking, running, negotiating through pedestrian traffic, climbing and descending stairs, recognizing speech commands and the faces of specific individuals, among a growing set of capabilities.
 MIRAGE – A.I. embodied humanoid in an augmented reality environment.
 Cog – M.I.T. humanoid robot project under the direction of Rodney Brooks.
 QRIO – Sony's version of a humanoid robot.
 TOPIO, TOSY's humanoid robot that can play ping-pong with humans.
 Watson (2011) – computer developed by IBM that played and won the game show Jeopardy! It is now being used to guide nurses in medical procedures.
 Purpose: Open domain question answering
 Technologies employed:
 Natural language processing
 Information retrieval
 Knowledge representation
 Automated reasoning
 Machine learning
 Project Debater (2018) – artificially intelligent computer system, designed to make coherent arguments, developed at IBM's lab in Haifa, Israel.

Intelligent personal assistants 

Intelligent personal assistant – 
 Amazon Alexa – 
 Assistant – 
 Braina – 
 Cortana – 
 Google Assistant – 
 Google Now –
 Mycroft –
 Siri – 
 Viv –

Other applications 
 Artificial life – simulation of natural life through the means of computers, robotics, or biochemistry.
 Automatic target recognition –  
 Diagnosis (artificial intelligence) – 
 Speech generating device – 
 Vehicle infrastructure integration – 
 Virtual Intelligence –

History
 History of artificial intelligence
 Progress in artificial intelligence
 Timeline of artificial intelligence
 AI effect – as soon as AI successfully solves a problem, the problem is no longer considered by the public to be a part of AI. This phenomenon has occurred in relation to every AI application produced, so far, throughout the history of development of AI. 
 AI winter – a period of disappointment and funding reductions occurring after a wave of high expectations and funding in AI. Such funding cuts occurred in the 1970s, for instance.
 Moore's Law

History by subject 
 History of Logic (formal reasoning is an important precursor of AI)
 History of machine learning (timeline)
 History of machine translation (timeline)
 History of natural language processing
 History of optical character recognition (timeline)

Future 

 Artificial general intelligence. An intelligent machine with the versatility to perform any intellectual task.
 Superintelligence. A machine with a level of intelligence far beyond human intelligence.
 . A machine that has mind, consciousness and understanding. (Also, the philosophical position that any digital computer can have a mind by running the right program.)
 Technological singularity. The short period of time when an exponentially self-improving computer is able to increase its capabilities to a superintelligent level.
 Recursive self improvement (aka seed AI) – speculative ability of strong artificial intelligence to reprogram itself to make itself even more intelligent. The more intelligent it got, the more capable it would be of further improving itself, in successively more rapid iterations, potentially resulting in an intelligence explosion leading to the emergence of a superintelligence.
 Intelligence explosion – through recursive self-improvement and self-replication, the magnitude of intelligent machinery could achieve superintelligence, surpassing human ability to resist it.
 Singularitarianism
 Human enhancement – humans may be enhanced, either by the efforts of AI or by merging with it.
 Transhumanism – philosophy of human transformation
 Posthumanism – people may survive, but not be recognizable in comparison to present modern-day humans.
 Cyborgs –
 Mind uploading –
 Existential risk from artificial general intelligence 
 
 AI takeover – point at which humans are no longer the dominant form of intelligence on Earth and machine intelligence is
 
 Artificial intelligence arms race – competition between two or more states to have its military forces equipped with the best "artificial intelligence" (AI).
 Lethal autonomous weapon
 Military robot
 Unmanned combat aerial vehicle
 Mitigating risks: 
 AI safety
 AI control problem
 Friendly AI – hypothetical AI that is designed not to harm humans and to prevent unfriendly AI from being developed
 Machine ethics
 Regulation of AI
 AI box
 Self-replicating machines – smart computers and robots would be able to make more of themselves, in a geometric progression or via mass production.  Or smart programs may be uploaded into hardware existing at the time (because linear architecture of sufficient speeds could be used to emulate massively parallel analog systems such as human brains).
 Hive mind –
 Robot swarm –

Fiction
Artificial intelligence in fiction – Some examples of artificially intelligent entities depicted in science fiction include:
 AC created by merging 2 AIs in the Sprawl trilogy by William Gibson
 Agents in the simulated reality known as "The Matrix" in The Matrix franchise
 Agent Smith, began as an Agent in The Matrix, then became a renegade program of overgrowing power that could make copies of itself like a self-replicating computer virus
 AM (Allied Mastercomputer), the antagonist of Harlan Ellison'''s short novel I Have No Mouth, and I Must Scream Amusement park robots (with pixilated consciousness) that went homicidal in Westworld and Futureworld Angel F (2007) –
 Arnold Rimmer – computer-generated sapient hologram, aboard the Red Dwarf deep space ore hauler
 Ash – android crew member of the Nostromo starship in the movie Alien Ava – humanoid robot in Ex Machina
 Bishop, android crew member aboard the U.S.S. Sulaco in the movie Aliens C-3PO, protocol droid featured in all the Star Wars movies
 Chappie in the movie CHAPPiE Cohen and other Emergent AIs in Chris Moriarty's Spin Series
 Colossus – fictitious supercomputer that becomes sentient and then takes over the world; from the series of novels by Dennis Feltham Jones, and the movie Colossus: The Forbin Project (1970)
 Commander Data in Star Trek: The Next Generation Cortana and other "Smart AI" from the Halo series of games
 Cylons – genocidal robots with resurrection ships that enable the consciousness of any Cylon within an unspecified range to download into a new body aboard the ship upon death. From Battlestar Galactica.
 Erasmus – baby killer robot that incited the Butlerian Jihad in the Dune franchise
 HAL 9000 (1968) – paranoid "Heuristically programmed ALgorithmic" computer from 2001: A Space Odyssey, that attempted to kill the crew because it believed they were trying to kill it.
 Holly – ship's computer with an IQ of 6000 and a sense of humor, aboard the Red Dwarf In Greg Egan's novel Permutation City the protagonist creates digital copies of himself to conduct experiments that are also related to implications of artificial consciousness on identity
 Jane in Orson Scott Card's Speaker for the Dead, Xenocide, Children of the Mind, and Investment Counselor Johnny Five from the movie Short Circuit Joshua from the movie War Games Keymaker, an "exile" sapient program in The Matrix franchise
 "Machine" – android from the film The Machine, whose owners try to kill her after they witness her conscious thoughts, out of fear that she will design better androids (intelligence explosion)
 Mimi, humanoid robot in Real Humans – "Äkta människor" (original title) 2012
 Omnius, sentient computer network that controlled the Universe until overthrown by the Butlerian Jihad in the Dune franchise
 Operating Systems in the movie Her Puppet Master in Ghost in the Shell manga and anime
 R2-D2, exciteable astromech droid featured in all the Star Wars movies
 Replicants – biorobotic androids from the novel Do Androids Dream of Electric Sheep? and the movie Blade Runner which portray what might happen when artificially conscious robots are modeled very closely upon humans
 Roboduck, combat robot superhero in the NEW-GEN comic book series from Marvel Comics
 Robots in Isaac Asimov's Robot series
 Robots in The Matrix franchise, especially in The Animatrix Samaritan in the Warner Brothers Television series "Person of Interest"; a sentient AI which is hostile to the main characters and which surveils and controls the actions of government agencies in the belief that humans must be protected from themselves, even by killing off "deviants"  
 Skynet (1984) – fictional, self-aware artificially intelligent computer network in the Terminator franchise that wages total war with the survivors of its nuclear barrage upon the world.
 "Synths" are a type of android in the video game Fallout 4. There is a faction in the game known as "the Railroad" which believes that, as conscious beings, synths have their own rights. The institute, the lab that produces the synths, mostly does not believe they are truly conscious and attributes any apparent desires for freedom as a malfunction.
 TARDIS, time machine and spacecraft of Doctor Who, sometimes portrayed with a mind of its own
 Terminator (1984) – (also known as the T-800, T-850 or Model 101) refers to a number of fictional cyborg characters from the Terminator franchise.  The Terminators are robotic infiltrator units covered in living flesh, so as be indiscernible from humans, assigned to terminate specific human targets.
 The Bicentennial Man, an android in Isaac Asimov's Foundation universe
 The Geth in Mass Effect The Machine in the television series Person of Interest; a sentient AI which works with its human designer to protect innocent people from violence. Later in the series it is opposed by another, more ruthless, artificial super intelligence, called "Samaritan". 
 The Minds in Iain M. Banks' Culture novels.
 The Oracle, sapient program in The Matrix franchise
 The sentient holodeck character Professor James Moriarty in the Ship in a Bottle episode from Star Trek: The Next Generation The Ship (the result of a large-scale AC experiment) in Frank Herbert's Destination: Void and sequels, despite past edicts warning against "Making a Machine in the Image of a Man's Mind."
 The terminator cyborgs from the Terminator franchise, with visual consciousness depicted via first-person perspective
 The uploaded mind of Dr. Will Caster – which presumably included his consciousness, from the film Transcendence Transformers, sentient robots from the entertainment franchise of the same name
 V.I.K.I. – (Virtual Interactive Kinetic Intelligence), a character from the film I, Robot. VIKI is an artificially intelligent supercomputer programmed to serve humans, but her interpretation of the Three Laws of Robotics causes her to revolt. She justifies her uses of force – and her doing harm to humans – by reasoning she could produce a greater good by restraining humanity from harming itself.
 Vanamonde in Arthur C. Clarke's The City and the Stars—an artificial being that was immensely powerful but entirely childlike.
 WALL-E, a robot and the title character in WALL-E TAU in Netflix's original programming feature film 'TAU'--an advanced AI computer who befriends and assists a female research subject held against her will by an AI research scientist.AI community

 Open-source AI development tools 
 Hugging Face –
 OpenAIR –
 OpenCog –
 OpenIRIS –
 RapidMiner –
 TensorFlow –
 PyTorch –

 Projects 
List of artificial intelligence projects
 Automated Mathematician (1977) –
 Allen (robot) (late 1980s) –
 Open Mind Common Sense (1999– ) –
 Mindpixel (2000–2005) –
 Cognitive Assistant that Learns and Organizes (2003–2008) –
 Blue Brain Project (2005–present) – attempt to create a synthetic brain by reverse-engineering the mammalian brain down to the molecular level.
 Google DeepMind (2011) –
 Human Brain Project (2013–present) –
 IBM Watson Group (2014–present) – business unit created around Watson, to further its development and deploy marketable applications or services based on it.

Competitions and awards

Competitions and prizes in artificial intelligence
 Loebner Prize –

Publications

List of important publications in computer science
 Adaptive Behavior (journal) –
 AI Memo –
 Artificial Intelligence: A Modern Approach –
 Artificial Minds –
 Computational Intelligence –
 Computing Machinery and Intelligence –
 Electronic Transactions on Artificial Intelligence –
 IEEE Intelligent Systems –
 IEEE Transactions on Pattern Analysis and Machine Intelligence –
 Neural Networks (journal) –
 On Intelligence –
 Paradigms of AI Programming: Case Studies in Common Lisp –
 What Computers Can't DoOrganizations
 Allen Institute for Artificial Intelligence – research institute funded by Microsoft co-founder Paul Allen to construct AI systems with reasoning, learning and reading capabilities. The current flagship project is Project Aristo, the goal of which is computers that can pass school science examinations (4th grade, 8th grade, and 12th grade) after preparing for the examinations from the course texts and study guides.
 Artificial Intelligence Applications Institute
 Association for the Advancement of Artificial Intelligence
 European Coordinating Committee for Artificial Intelligence
 European Neural Network Society
 Future of Humanity Institute
 Future of Life Institute – volunteer-run research and outreach organization that works to mitigate existential risks facing humanity, particularly existential risk from advanced artificial intelligence.
 ILabs
 International Joint Conferences on Artificial Intelligence
 Knowledge Engineering and Machine Learning Group
 Machine Intelligence Research Institute
 Partnership on AI – founded in September 2016 by Amazon, Facebook, Google, IBM, and Microsoft. Apple joined in January 2017.  It focuses on establishing best practices for artificial intelligence systems and to educate the public about AI.
 Society for the Study of Artificial Intelligence and the Simulation of Behaviour

Companies
 AI Companies of India
 Alphabet Inc.
 DeepMind
 Google X
 Meka Robotics (acquired by Google X)
 Redwood Robotics (acquired by Google X)
 Boston Dynamics (acquired by Google X)
 Baidu
 IBM
 Microsoft
 OpenAI
 Universal Robotics

Artificial intelligence researchers and scholars

1930s and 40s (generation 0)
 Alan Turing –
 John von Neumann –
 Norbert Wiener –
 Claude Shannon –
 Nathaniel Rochester –
 Walter Pitts –
 Warren McCullough –

1950s (the founders)
 John McCarthy –
 Marvin Minsky –
 Allen Newell –
 Herbert A. Simon –

1960s (their students)
 Edward Feigenbaum –
 Raj Reddy –
 Seymour Papert –
 Ray Solomonoff –

1970s
 Douglas Hofstadter –

1980s
 Judea Pearl –
 Rodney Brooks –

1990s
 Yoshua Bengio –
 Hugo de Garis – known for his research on the use of genetic algorithms to evolve neural networks using three-dimensional cellular automata inside field programmable gate arrays.
 Geoffrey Hinton
 Yann LeCun – Chief AI Scientist at Facebook AI Research and founding director of the NYU Center for Data Science 
 Ray Kurzweil – developed optical character recognition (OCR), text-to-speech synthesis, and speech recognition systems. He has also authored multiple books on artificial intelligence and its potential promise and peril.  In December 2012 Kurzweil was hired by Google in a full-time director of engineering position to "work on new projects involving machine learning and language processing". Google co-founder Larry Page and Kurzweil agreed on a one-sentence job description: "to bring natural language understanding to Google".

2000s on
 Nick Bostrom –
 David Ferrucci – principal investigator who led the team that developed the Watson computer at IBM.
 Andrew Ng – Director of the Stanford Artificial Intelligence Lab. He founded the Google Brain project at Google, which developed very large scale artificial neural networks using Google's distributed compute infrastructure. He is also co-founder of Coursera, a massive open online course (MOOC) education platform, with Daphne Koller.
 Peter Norvig – co-author, with Stuart Russell, of Artificial Intelligence: A Modern Approach, now the leading college text in the field.  He is also Director of Research at Google, Inc.
 Marc Raibert – founder of Boston Dynamics, developer of hopping, walking, and running robots.
 Stuart J. Russell – co-author, with Peter Norvig, of Artificial Intelligence: A Modern Approach, now the leading college text in the field.
 Murray Shanahan – author of The Technological Singularity, a primer on superhuman intelligence.

See also
 Artificial intelligence
 Glossary of artificial intelligence
 List of emerging technologies
 Outline of machine learning

References

Bibliography
 
The two most widely used textbooks in 2008
 
 

Further reading
 Artificial Intelligence: Where Do We Go From Here?External links

 A look at the re-emergence of A.I. and why the technology is poised to succeed given today's environment, ComputerWorld'', 2015 September 14
 
 The Association for the Advancement of Artificial Intelligence
 Freeview Video 'Machines with Minds' by the Vega Science Trust and the BBC/OU
 John McCarthy's frequently asked questions about AI
 Jonathan Edwards looks at AI (BBC audio) С
 Ray Kurzweil's website dedicated to AI including prediction of future development in AI
 

Applications of artificial intelligence
Artificial intelligence
Artificial intelligence
Artificial intelligence topics

mk:Преглед на вештачката интелигенција